John Addenbrooke may refer to:

 John Addenbrooke (philanthropist) (1680–1719), English medical doctor and founder of Addenbrooke's Hospital
 John Addenbrooke (priest) (died 1776), Dean of Lichfield
 John Addenbrooke (footballer) (1900–1961), English footballer